Women senators may refer to:

List of women in Seanad Éireann, the upper house in Ireland
Women in the Australian Senate
Women in the French Senate
Women in the Philippine Senate
Women in the United States Senate
Women in the Sri Lankan Parliament, includes current female Senators
Women in the 44th Canadian Parliament, includes current female Senators

See also
Women in Congress (disambiguation)
 Women in the House (disambiguation)
Women in House of Representatives (disambiguation)
Women in Parliament (disambiguation)